Sierra de Gádor of Sierra Gador is a mountain range in southwest of the province of Almería, Spain.

It is bordered to the north by Sierra Nevada and to the south by the Mediterranean Sea.

It is a isolated massif in an arid and semi-arid complex. It has a very uneven relief. Its average height decrease to the east, with peaks Molinero (1,499 m), Piorno (1,444 m) and Pozuelo (1,263 m).  

This part may be geologically divided into two distinct areas:  a valley made up of sedimentary materials and the hilly area with elevations up to 1,000 m covered mostly by bushes and grasslands.

References

Mountains of Spain
Almería